Candomblé Jejé, also known as Brazilian Vodum, is one of the major branches (nations) of Candomblé. It developed in the Portuguese Empire among Fon and Ewe slaves.

Vodums

Jejé spirits are called Voduns (sing. Vodum).  According to tradition, they were introduced into the Kingdom of Dahomey from nearby lands by its founder King Adja-Tado, on the advice of a bokono (seer). Their cult was reorganized and uniformized by King Agajah in the 18th century.

Jejé Vodums are sometimes worshiped in houses of other nations by different names. For instance, the Vodum Dan or Bessen is called Oxumarê in Candomblé Ketu. Conversely, the Ketu Orixás may be worshiped in Jejé houses, but retain their names.

Voduns are organized into families:

Bibliography

See also
Candomblé
Tambor de Mina (mixture of Dahomean religion, Yoruba Religion, Indigenous American, and European traditions, in Maranhão, Brazil)

Candomblé